List of Turkish Folk Music anonymous songs, songwriter uncertain (anonymous music), in accordance with the Turkish folk music songs list.

Songs

References

External links
Turkish Folk music songs archive 

Turkish folk songs
Folk songs, anon
Turkish Folk Music anonymous songs